Jan Pol is a smock mill in Dalen, Netherlands. It was built in 1876. The mill is a Rijksmonument, number 44562.

History
Jan Pol was built in 1876, replacing a mill that had been built in 1820 and burnt down following a lightning strike in 1875. It was built by millwright Schiller from Dalfsen, Overijssel. In operation  until 1947, it was  stripped of machinery in 1958. Restoration by millwright Huberts of Coevorden began in 1971 and was completed in 1972. Further restoration was undertaken in 1993 by millwrights Doornbosch of Adorp, Groningen. The mill is named for Jan Pol, who owned it from 1942 until his death in 1982. It is the tallest windmill standing today in Drenthe.

Description

Jan Pol is what the Dutch describe as an "achtkante stellingmolen", a smock mill with a stage. The mill has a three-storey brick base with a three-storey smock. The smock and cap are thatched. The four Common sails span . They are carried on a cast-iron windshaft which was made by the millwrights Prins van Oranje, of The Hague in 1866. The windshaft carries the brake wheel, which has 61 cogs. It drives the wallower at the top of the upright shaft. The wallower has 34 cogs. At the bottom of the upright shaft, the great spur wheel with 115 cogs drives two lantern pinion stone nuts, one with 37 staves and one with 38 staves. The pearl barley stones are driven by a stone nut with 28 cogs.

Public access

Jan Pol is open on Tuesdays, Wednesdays, Thursdays and Saturdays from 1 April to 1 November between 13:30 and 16:30. It is also open throughout the year by appointment.

References

External links

Website of the mill

Coevorden
Windmills in Drenthe
Smock mills in the Netherlands
Windmills completed in 1876
Grinding mills in the Netherlands
Rijksmonuments in Drenthe
Octagonal buildings in the Netherlands